The 2021 Sparkassen ATP Challenger was a professional tennis tournament played on indoor hard courts in Ortisei, Italy between 8 and 14 November 2021. It was the twelfth edition of the tournament and was part of the 2021 ATP Challenger Tour.

Singles main-draw entrants

Seeds

 1 Rankings are as of 1 November 2021.

Other entrants
The following players received wildcards into the singles main draw:
  Matteo Arnaldi
  Luca Nardi
  Alexander Weis

The following players received entry from the qualifying draw:
  Alexander Cozbinov
  Nerman Fatić
  Lucas Miedler
  Tobias Simon

Champions

Singles

 Oscar Otte def.  Maxime Cressy 7–6(7–5), 6–4.

Doubles

  Antonio Šančić /  Tristan-Samuel Weissborn def.  Alexander Erler /  Lucas Miedler 7–6(10–8), 4–6, [10–8].

References

2021 ATP Challenger Tour
2021
2021 in Italian tennis
November 2021 sports events in Italy